Frost Tower may refer to:

 Frost Bank Tower in Austin, Texas, USA
 Frost Tower (San Antonio) in San Antonio, Texas, USA